Colichemarde is a type of small sword (often written "smallsword") blade that was popular from the late 17th century to the middle 18th century.

Overview
The small sword is considered to be a descendant of the "transitional rapier", which itself evolved from the rapier due to the demand for a lighter sword, easier to wear. The shape of a colichemarde blade features a wide forte, which abruptly tapers to a much narrower form  at a point varying between a fifth to a third of the blade length from the hilt. The blade cross section was most often triangular and hollow-ground. This configuration combines good parrying characteristics, due to the wide blade forte, with the good maneuverability and thrusting characteristics imparted by the narrow blade foible. Its lighter weight, shorter length and superior balance, compared to the rapier, allowed faster and more accurate movement of the blade. This enabled the fencer to achieve a more precisely targeted thrust on an adversary.

The point where the blade of a sword joins the tang was a recognized weak point. The tang was often made of malleable iron and forge-welded to the steel of the blade. A wider blade at this point of transition, such as is seen in the colichemarde, may have been viewed as offering a stronger union.

Brief history

The colichemarde blade configuration is sometimes credited to one Graf von Königsmark (perhaps Otto Wilhelm Königsmarck), owing to the two names' similarity in pronunciation. The colichemarde first appeared about 1680 and was popular during the next 40 years at the royal European courts. It was especially popular with the officers of the French and Indian War period. George Washington was presented with one during his inauguration. The widespread misapprehension that the colichemarde quickly ceased to be produced after 1720 dates to the opinion given by Sir Richard Burton in his Book of the Sword (1884). However, many securely dated colichemarde swords from as late as the 1770s can be found in collections.

This sword appeared at about the same time as the foil. However the foil was created for practicing fencing at court, while the colichemarde was created for dueling.  It made frequent appearances in the duels of New Orleans.

See also

 Sabre (fencing)
 Duel
 Rapier
 Small sword
 Flame-bladed sword
 Spada da lato

Notes

 
Fencing
Early Modern European swords